Gastón Nicolás Caprari (born 17 February 1985) is an Argentine former footballer.

Born in Córdoba, Argentina and a graduate of Instituto de Córdoba's youth system, Caprari had his greatest success with San Martín de San Juan. He helped the club gain promotion to the Argentine Primera División in his first season, and would play several seasons in the top league with San Martín.

References

External links
 
 

1985 births
Living people
Argentine footballers
Argentine expatriate footballers
Argentine expatriate sportspeople in Spain
Instituto footballers
Boca Unidos footballers
Magallanes footballers
Club Atlético Patronato footballers
San Martín de San Juan footballers
Primera B de Chile players
Expatriate footballers in Chile
Expatriate footballers in Spain
Expatriate footballers in Mexico
Association football forwards
Footballers from Córdoba, Argentina
Argentine expatriate sportspeople in Mexico
Argentine expatriate sportspeople in Chile